The 2015 FIM Moto3 World Championship was a part of the 67th F.I.M. Road Racing World Championship season. Álex Márquez was the reigning series champion but he did not defend his title as he joined the series' intermediate class, Moto2.
Leopard Racing rider Kent started the season with wins at three of the first four races and his lowest finish in the first half of the season was fourth, leading the championship by 66 points at the mid-season break. He only visited the podium once in the second half of the season – a victory at Silverstone – as Enea Bastianini (Gresini Racing) and latterly, Miguel Oliveira (Ajo Motorsport) started to cut into his advantage. Oliveira trailed Kent by 110 points with 6 races remaining, but finished with 4 wins and 2 seconds in those races, and took the championship race to the final event as he became the closest challenger to Kent. Ultimately, Kent's ninth-place finish in Valencia gave him the championship by six points over Oliveira; both riders finished with six wins each, as Oliveira became Portugal's first motorcycle Grand Prix race-winner. Bastianini finished third in the championship, fifty-three points behind Kent; he won one race during the season, at Misano.

Romano Fenati was the race-winner at Le Mans for Sky Racing Team VR46, and Niccolò Antonelli won two races for Ongetta–Rivacold at Brno, and Motegi. The duo battled for fourth in the championship, which was settled in Fenati's favour after Antonelli took Fenati, Efrén Vázquez and himself out of the final race at Valencia. The season's other winners were Alexis Masbou, who won the season-opening race in Qatar for SaxoPrint–RTG, and Livio Loi, who won by nearly 40 seconds at Indianapolis in a wet-to-dry race for RW Racing GP. The top rookie rider was Jorge Navarro for Estrella Galicia 0,0 in seventh place in the final championship standings; he finished with four podium finishes in the final five races. The manufacturers' standings were headed by Honda for the first time in the lightweight class since , with at least one motorcycle from the company finishing on the podium – including eleven wins – at every race during the season. Honda finished 70 points clear of KTM, who won the remaining 7 races.

2015 was the last season that Eni was the sole fuel supplier for Moto3, as Total became the new fuel supplier for 2016.

Calendar

The Fédération Internationale de Motocyclisme released an 18-race official calendar on 26 September 2014.

 ‡ = Night race
 †† = Saturday race

Calendar changes
 The British Grand Prix had been scheduled to return to Donington Park for the first time since 2009, ahead of a planned move to the brand-new Circuit of Wales in 2016. However, Donington Park pulled out of hosting the event on 10 February 2015, citing financial delays.

Teams and riders
Starting in 2015, the rolling chassis must be homologated and supplied by the engine manufacturers participating in the Moto3 class. Each manufacturer was permitted to homologate only one version of its own chassis and one version of any third-party supplied chassis they made available. Each component designated as a performance part – relating to the chassis, swingarm, fuel tank, seat, bodywork and suspensions – could be updated a maximum of once per season and had to be available to all customers of that manufacturer at the same time.

A provisional entry list was released by the Fédération Internationale de Motocyclisme on 23 October 2014. An updated entry list was released on 2 February 2015. All teams used Dunlop tyres.

Results and standings

Grands Prix

Riders' standings
Scoring system
Points were awarded to the top fifteen finishers. A rider had to finish the race to earn points.

Constructors' standings
Points were awarded to the top fifteen finishers. A rider had to finish the race to earn points.

 Each constructor got the same number of points as their best placed rider in each race.

Notes

References

External links
 The official website of Grand Prix motorcycle racing

Moto3
Grand Prix motorcycle racing seasons